Cumberland Presbyterian Church may refer to:

Cumberland Presbyterian Church, the religious denomination

or to specific churches within it, including:

in the United States
(by state then city)
Cumberland Presbyterian Church (Clarendon, Arkansas), listed on the National Register of Historic Places (NRHP ) in Monroe County
Mount Olive Cumberland Presbyterian Church, Mount Olive, Arkansas, NRHP-listed
Caney Springs Cumberland Presbyterian Church, Sage, AR, NRHP-listed
Cumberland Presbyterian Church (Searcy, Arkansas), NRHP-listed
Mount Olivet Cumberland Presbyterian Church, Bowling Green, KY, NRHP-listed
Fredonia Cumberland Presbyterian Church, Fredonia, KY, NRHP-listed
Greensburg Cumberland Presbyterian Church, Greensburg, KY, NRHP-listed
Cumberland Presbyterian Church (Peoria, Illinois), NRHP-listed
Cumberland Presbyterian Church (Lexington, Missouri), NRHP-listed
New Lebanon Cumberland Presbyterian Church and School, New Lebanon, MO, NRHP-listed
Cane Ridge Cumberland Presbyterian Church, Antioch, TN, NRHP-listed
Clear Springs Cumberland Presbyterian Church, Calhoun, TN, NRHP-listed
Chapel Hill Cumberland Presbyterian Church, Chapel Hill, TN, NRHP-listed
Charleston Cumberland Presbyterian Church, Charleston, TN, NRHP-listed
Pleasant Mount Cumberland Presbyterian Church, Columbia, TN, NRHP-listed
New Bethel Cumberland Presbyterian Church, Greeneville, TN, NRHP-listed
Cumberland Presbyterian Church of Loudon, Loudon, TN, NRHP-listed
Manchester Cumberland Presbyterian Church, Manchester, TN, NRHP-listed
First Cumberland Presbyterian Church-McKenzie, McKenzie, TN, NRHP-listed
Bear Creek Cumberland Presbyterian Church, Mooresville, TN, NRHP-listed
Waynesboro Cumberland Presbyterian Church Waynesboro, TN, NRHP-listed